
El Triunfo Lake is a lake in the Beni Department, Bolivia.

Geography 
The El Triunfo lagoon is a Bolivian Amazon freshwater lagoon located in the east part of the Beni department, near the Guaporé River and 4 kilometers south of the border with Brazil. Its coastal perimeter is 17 kilometers.

It is characterized by having a round shape as well as being surrounded by a thick jungle.

References 

Lakes of Beni Department